A media player could refer to:
Digital media player, home appliances that play digital media
Media player software, software that plays digital media
Portable media player, portable hardware that plays digital media
Windows Media Player, software that plays digital media included in Windows
Media Player (Windows 11), Media player software included in Windows 11 replacing Groove Music